Rubens Ricupero (born March 1, 1937) is a Brazilian academic, economist, bureaucrat and diplomat.  He served as the fifth Secretary General of the United Nations Conference on Trade and Development from September 1995 to September 2004.

Education
Ricupero earned a Bachelor in Law from the University of São Paulo in 1959.  He also studied at the Rio Branco Institute, a branch of the Brazilian Ministry of Foreign Relations.

Career
From 1979 to 1995, Ricupero taught courses in international relations at the University of Brasília; and in the same period, he also taught the history of Brazilian diplomatic relations at the Rio Branco Institute.
 
Ricupero was Chairman of the Finance Committee at the United Nations Conference on Environment and Development which was held in Rio de Janeiro in 1992.   He was the Brazilian Minister of the Environment and Amazonian Affairs, before becoming Minister of Finance in 1994.

He is credited with providing continuity during the implementation of the Plano Real. This plan encompassed anti-inflationary monetary reform, the introduction of the modern Brazilian real and other measures taken to stabilize the Brazilian economy.

Diplomatic postings have included:
 Ambassador and Permanent Representative to the UN in Geneva (1987–1991)
 Ambassador to the United States of America (1991–1993)
 Ambassador to Italy (1995)
 GATT, Chairman of Council of Representatives (1989, 1991)

Selected works
Ricupero's published encompass 48 works in 58 publications in 4 languages and 400 library holdings.

 2010 — Diário de bordo: A viagem presidencial de Tancredo
 2007 — A abertura dos portos
 2006 — A ONU no século XXI: perspectivas
 2004 — Beyond Conventional Wisdom in development policy: an Intellectual History of UNCTAD 1964-2004
 2001 — O Brasil e o dilema da globalização
 2000 — Rio Branco: o Brasil no mundo
 1998 — O ponto ótimo da crise. Rio de Janeiro: Ed. Revan. ;   OCLC 254511468
 1995 — Visões do Brasil : ensaios sobre a história e a inserção internacional do Brasil. Rio de Janeiro;São Paulo : Ed. Record. ;   OCLC 254090142
 1994 — A Nova inserção internacional do Brasil
 1994 — Estabilidade e crescimento: os desafios do real
 1993 — NAFTA and Brazil (with Sérgio Estanislav do Amaral, Robert Charles Kelso). Coral Gables, Florida: North-South Center, University of Miami. OCLC  29661557
 1992 — O Futuro do Brasil : a América Latina e o fim da guerra fria
 1991 — Brasil em mudança

Honours
  Santos-Dumont Merit Medal (1973)
 Grand Cordon of the Order of the Rising Sun (2019)

Notes

References
  Dornbusch, Rüdiger and Sebastian Edwards. (1995).  Reform, Recovery, and Growth: Latin America and the Middle East. Chicago: University of Chicago Press. ;

External links
 Rubens Ricupero

|-

|-

|-

|-

Living people
1937 births
Finance Ministers of Brazil
Ambassadors of Brazil to the United States
Permanent Representatives of Brazil to the United Nations
Brazilian columnists
Academic staff of the University of Brasília
University of São Paulo alumni
Grand Cordons of the Order of the Rising Sun